Elizabeth Anne Kerekere (born ) is a New Zealand politician and LGBTQ activist and scholar. Since 2020, she has been a member of parliament for the Green Party. She is the founder and chair of Tīwhanawhana Trust.

Kerekere is also an artist and graduated from Eastern Institute of Technology with a bachelor in Māori visual arts. In 2000, in her role of Te Kairuruku, Ngā Kaupapa Māori at Dowse Art Museum she curated an exhibition called Kaumatua Anō te Ātaahua: Honouring the Gifts of our Elders.

Personal life 
Kerekere was born in Gisborne, New Zealand. Her father, Karauria Tarao "Bison" Kerekere, was an artist and master carver. He was Māori, and of the Te Whānau a Kai, Te Aitanga-a-Māhaki, Rongowhakaata, Ngāi Tāmanuhiri and Ngāti Oneone iwi. Elizabeth's mother Erin is Irish, from County Clare and County Tipperary. Kerekere is a lesbian, and is married to Alofa Aiono, whom she met in 1992. The couple held their civil union in Te Papa's marae,  Te Marae Rongomaraero, which Kerekere advised on the design of.

Academic career 
Throughout her studies at the Eastern Institute of Technology (EIT), Kerekere focussed on mana tūpuna (ancestors), mana wāhine (women) and mana takatāpui (the right to live and love regardless of sexual orientation and gender identity) and was the only degree graduate to have a solo exhibition. After graduating from EIT, Kerekere spent the following five years researching the development of takatāpui identity in the 21st century at Victoria University of Wellington, arguing that pre-colonial Māori were sexually experimental people who openly accepted gender and sexual fluidity, and completing a PhD in 2017.

Political career

Kerekere stood in the Ikaroa-Rāwhiti electorate for the Green Party of Aotearoa New Zealand in the 2017 New Zealand general election. She placed third of three candidates with 1,924 votes. Her list placing of 19th was too low for her to enter parliament as a list MP.

Kerekere contested Ikaroa-Rāwhiti for the Green Party again in 2020. Although she again did not win Ikaroa-Rāwhiti, Kerekere entered parliament ninth on the Green Party's list.

On 15 March 2022, Kerekere resigned from her position as the Green Party spokesperson for Health and COVID-19 Response after she broke COVID-19 isolation rules by flying from Gisborne to Wellington despite being a household contact. She was also removed from her position on the Health Select Committee until further notice. The Green Party also notified health authorities of the breach. Kerekere apologised for her actions and stated that she would cooperate with investigators.

References

External links
 

Living people
1966 births
New Zealand LGBT rights activists
New Zealand artists
Candidates in the 2020 New Zealand general election
Members of the New Zealand House of Representatives
Green Party of Aotearoa New Zealand MPs
New Zealand list MPs
Māori MPs
Lesbian politicians
LGBT members of the Parliament of New Zealand
LGBT women
Te Aitanga-a-Māhaki people
Rongowhakaata people
Ngāi Tāmanuhiri people
New Zealand people of Irish descent
Victoria University of Wellington alumni
People from Gisborne, New Zealand
21st-century New Zealand women politicians
Takatāpui